Lenzburg Stadt railway station was a railway station in Lenzburg in the Swiss canton of Aargau.

The station was opened in 1895 by Schweizerische Seethalbahn Aktiengesellschaft, on the Seetal line to Wildegg. The station building by  had a small restaurant. By 1910, the line was electrified. The station (and line) were nationalized by Swiss Federal Railways in 1922. The present-day Malagarain street is built on some of the right of way.

Trains from Lenzburg Stadt to  had to reverse at "Lenzburg Spitzkehre". Towards Wildegg, the line passed through a small, now pedestrian, tunnel in the railway embankment.

Closure 

With the opening of the Heitersberg railway line in 1975, service from Lenzburg station further improved and Lenzburg Stadt was less used. Passenger service ended on 2 June 1984 and installations were gradually dismantled. The station building was destroyed in 2003.

After the tracks were removed, a covered bypass road (Kerntangente) was built on the land. The (former) building remained in the canton's building inventory until 2017. A house across the tracks of the former station still exists in 2021.

Gallery

References

External links 

Railway stations in the canton of Aargau
Swiss Federal Railways stations
Disused railway stations in Switzerland
Railway stations closed in 2005
Lenzburg
Railway stations in Switzerland opened in 1895